Géza Füster  (19 February 1910 in Budapest, Hungary – 30 December 1990 in Toronto, Ontario, Canada) was a Hungarian-Canadian chess International Master.

Born in Budapest, Füster won his first of many Budapest Championships in 1936. During World War II, he played in several strong tournaments. In 1941, he won the Hungarian Championship. In 1941, he took 4th, behind Jan Foltys, Jozsef Szily and Ludovit Potuček, in Trenčianske Teplice.
  
In September 1941, he took 11th out of 16 competitors at Munich with 6.5/15, but drew his game with World Champion Alexander Alekhine. The event was won by Gösta Stoltz. In September 1942, he tied for 3rd-5th in Munich (München B, Qualification Tournament). In 1943, he took 2nd, behind Gedeon Barcza, in Diosgyör (Hungarian championship). In 1943, he won in Kolozsvár. In 1943-44, he won the Hungarian correspondence championship.

After the war, he defected. He planned to cross the border at East Berlin with Pal Benko. Füster made it across the border, but Benko was apprehended and sent to prison for nearly three years. Fuster made it to Canada in 1953, settling in Toronto. Füster's first success in his new land was winning the Toronto City Championship in 1954; he repeated in 1955, 1956, 1962, 1969, and 1971 (shared).

Füster played in many Canadian championships. In 1955, he took 6th in Ottawa (Closed Canadian Chess Championship). In 1955, he was Canadian Speed Champion. In 1957, he won the U.S. Speed Championship. He took 2nd, behind Povilas Vaitonis, in the 1957 Closed Canadian Championship in Vancouver. He played and took last place in the Interzonal at Portorož in 1958.

Füster also represented Canada in two Chess Olympiads in 1958 at Munich (8.5/14 on board 4; (+5 =7 -2)), and in 1970 at Siegen (+1 =1 -4) as second reserve.

He was awarded the International Master title in 1969, following his strong performance in the Closed Canadian Chess Championship, held at Pointe-Claire.

Füster was a fixture at the YMCA Chess Club and later the Toronto Chess Club. He was a lover of speed chess, very generous with advice and encouragement to young players, and beloved for his aphorisms. When an opponent played a dubious move he would always say: "When a player is weak I say: 'Will you come again to play tomorrow?'"

He died at Toronto in 1990.

See also
 List of Eastern Bloc defectors

References

External links 

1910 births
1990 deaths
Sportspeople from Budapest
Hungarian chess players
Canadian chess players
Chess International Masters
Chess Olympiad competitors
Hungarian defectors
Hungarian emigrants to Canada
Sportspeople from Toronto
20th-century chess players